Cooperation Consortium of Beijing High Technology Universities (known as Beijing Tech) is an organization of research universities devoted to strengthen the interscholastic cooperation in researches and innovation. Founded in 2011, Beijing Tech now have 12 member universities, all of which are well-known polytechnic research universities in China.

The 12 member schools have good reputations in a range of fields, such as information technology, electric engineering, petroleum engineering, energy engineering, material science, transport, telecommunication, nuclear physics, chemical engineering, environmental science, geology, forestry, shipbuilding and mining, which are key disciplines in industry and economy. The objective of this university alliance is to be the research and innovation leaders of those disciplines in China.  

Currently, the 12 members of Beijing Tech have totally 16 national key laboratories, 14 national laboratories of engineering and 14 "Project 111" bases. They have been issued more than 300 national-level awards. 8 out of 12 member schools are located in Beijing, while the Yanshan University is located in Qinhuangdao; the Xidian University (aka Xi'an Electrical Technology University) is in Xi'an; the Harbin Engineering University is in Harbin.

Members
 Beijing University of Chemical Technology
 Beijing Jiaotong University
 University of Science & Technology Beijing
 Beijing Forestry University
 Yanshan University
 Beijing University of Posts and Telecommunications
 Harbin Engineering University
 Xi'an Electrical Technology University
 China University of Geosciences (Beijing)
 China University of Mining & Technology (Beijing)
 China University of Petroleum (Beijing)
 North China Electric Power University - Beijing Campus

References

2011 establishments in China
Organizations established in 2011
National research and education networks